KQRK (99.7 FM, "Q Country 99.7") is a commercial radio station in Pablo, Montana, United States, broadcasting to the Kalispell-Flathead Valley area of Montana. KQRK airs a country music format.

History
On July 3, 2013 KQRK and its country format moved from 92.3 FM Ronan, Montana to 99.7 FM Pablo, Montana, swapping frequencies with CHR-formatted KKMT.

Previous logo

External links
KQRK official website

QRK
Country radio stations in the United States